Minuscule 2613 (in the Gregory-Aland numbering), is a Greek minuscule manuscript of the New Testament, on parchment. Dated paleographically to the 11th century.

Description  
The codex contains the complete text of the four Gospels on 321 parchment leaves (18 cm by 14.4 cm). The text is written in one column per page, in 18 lines per page. 

Aland did not place it to any Category.
According to the Claremont Profile Method it represents textual group M106 in Luke 1, Luke 10, and Luke 20.

History  

The codex now is located in the Kenneth Willis Clark Collection of the Duke University (Gk MS 6)  at Durham.

See also 
 List of New Testament minuscules
 Textual criticism

References

External links 

 Minuscule 2613 at the Kenneth Willis Clark Collection of Greek Manuscripts 

Greek New Testament minuscules
11th-century biblical manuscripts
Duke University Libraries